The 1982–83 Segunda División season saw 20 teams participate in the second flight Spanish league. Real Murcia, Cádiz CF and RCD Mallorca were promoted to Primera División. Deportivo Alavés, CE Sabadell FC, Jerez Deportivo and Córdoba CF were relegated to Segunda División B.

Team locations and managers

League table

Results

Top goalscorers

Segunda División seasons
2
Spain